Nicholas Dunster Hopton (born 8 October 1965) is a British diplomat who was the head of the UK embassy in Libya.

Hopton was educated at St Peter's School, York and Magdalene College, Cambridge. He joined the Foreign and Commonwealth Office in 1989 and served in Paris, Rome and Rabat. He worked on the national security team at the Cabinet Office and was Private Secretary to the Minister of State for Europe.

He assumed his first ambassadorial position as Ambassador to Yemen from 2012 to 2013, before serving as Ambassador to Qatar between 2013 and 2015. In December 2015 he was appointed British chargé d'affaires in Iran. Following the improvement in relations between the United Kingdom and Iran, Hopton was made Ambassador to Iran in September 2016 – the first British ambassador to the country since 2011. He was appointed chargé d'affaires at the British embassy in Libya in September 2019. He was succeeded by Caroline Hurndall in September 2021.

From 2013 to 2014 Hopton was a visiting academic at St Antony's College, Oxford.

References

1965 births
Living people
People educated at St Peter's School, York
Alumni of Magdalene College, Cambridge
Ambassadors of the United Kingdom to Libya
Ambassadors of the United Kingdom to Iran
Ambassadors of the United Kingdom to Qatar
Ambassadors of the United Kingdom to Yemen